Ron Thompson (born January 31, 1941) is an American film, television, theatre actor, singer, dancer, and songwriter.

Born in Louisville, Kentucky, Thompson is perhaps best known for his dual lead roles in Ralph Bakshi's critically acclaimed rotoscope film American Pop and the 1970s TV series Baretta in the role of Detective Nopke.

Thompson had a brief career as a rock singer in the 1960s and wrote and recorded a number of singles as Ronnie Thompson under the guidance of his mentor and friend, rockabilly singer Ersel Hickey.

Thompson originated the role of Shanty Mulligan in the 1969 Pulitzer Prize winning play No Place to be Somebody by Charles Gordone and won the Los Angeles Drama Critics Circle Award for his 1973 theatre lead performance in the play Does a Tiger Wear a Necktie?

The Progress Bulletin praised Thompson's performance in the 1976 Felton Perry play Buy the Bi and Bye calling it an "offbeat and hilarious black satire with a zinging performance by Ron Thompson."

Thompson did a dramatic portrayal of Henry David Thoreau on the 1976 NBC television series The Rebels.

Thompson starred in the 2018 thriller film Cargo.

Theatre

Film

Television

References

External links

'American Pop'... Matters: Ron Thompson, the Illustrated Man Unsung interview at PopMatters

Beyond the Marquee - EXCLUSIVE: Ralph Bakshi's AMERICAN POP – Video of Historic Q&A with Actor Ron Thompson

The Only One In The Room Podcast
Ron Thompson WPWL 103.7 radio interview

Living people
1941 births
1940s births
Male actors from Louisville, Kentucky
American male film actors
American male television actors
American male stage actors
American male voice actors
Songwriters from Kentucky
Musicians from Louisville, Kentucky
American rock singers
20th-century American male actors
21st-century American male actors
Singers from Kentucky
Rock musicians from Kentucky